Neocyamus is a genus of amphipod belonging to the family Cyamidae.

Species:

Neocyamus physeteris

References

Amphipoda